Liolaemus ornatus, the  ornate tree iguana, is a species of lizard in the family Iguanidae.  It is found in Argentina, Chile, Bolivia, and Peru.

References

ornatus
Lizards of South America
Reptiles of Argentina
Reptiles described in 1898
Taxa named by Julio Germán Koslowsky